The Mohammed Bin Rashid Al Maktoum Global Initiatives (MBRGI) is a philanthropic foundation based in the United Arab Emirates (UAE). MBRGI was launched in 2015, consolidating some 33 philanthropic initiatives undertaken by Mohammed bin Rashid Al Maktoum, Vice President and Prime Minister of the United Arab Emirates and Ruler of Dubai, over the past two and more decades.

During 2017, the Foundation invested AED 1.8 billion (US$490 million). The foundation has 543 permanent staff.

The entities under MBRGI work to a stated goal of providing humanitarian relief, charity and development, as well as spreading hope through projects that enhance people’s lives, contribute to societal progress, and establish a more stable and advanced human future, especially in the Arab world.

Recent initiatives undertaken by MBRGI include the 'One Million Arab Coders' project, which aims to extend free coding training to a million young people across the Arab world; the Arab Reading Challenge which, and the Arabic eLearning Challenge, which saw volunteers translate 5,000 maths and science online learning videos into Arabic. That effort led to the launch of Madrasa, a platform to make the content available to Arabic-speaking students.

Five pillars 
MBRGI defines its work under five pillars: humanitarian aid and relief; healthcare and disease control; spreading education and knowledge; innovation and entrepreneurship and empowering communities.

Humanitarian aid and relief

The initiatives and organisations falling under the Humanitarian Aid & Relief pillar seek to provide urgent aid and relief to communities affected by crises and disasters. They offer aid and developmental support for communities facing challenges such as poverty and conflict.

In 2017, total spending on humanitarian aid and relief initiatives, programmes and projects totalled AED 194 million.

 The International Humanitarian City (IHC)
 The Mohammed Bin Rashid Al Maktoum Humanitarian and Charity Establishment
 UAE Water Aid (In Arabic, Suqia)
 UAE Food Bank
 Mohammed bin Rashid Global Centre for Endowment Consultancy

Healthcare and disease control

MBRGI's work within the scope of this pillar aims to alleviate the suffering of communities lacking access to proper medical treatment, as well as dealing with basic health issues. It takes preventative measures against infectious diseases and contributes to the eradication of debilitating communicable diseases. Support is provided through awareness campaigns, treatment programmes, research funding and enabling medical staff and health workers.

MBRGI's 2017 spending on the programmes and initiatives under healthcare & disease control doubled to AED 477 million.

 Al Jalila Foundation
 Noor Dubai

Spreading education and knowledge

MBRGI manages a number of initiatives and programmes that aim to combat ignorance and illiteracy, providing essential basic education in developing countries, while reinforcing the Arab region’s heritage as a centre of knowledge through cultural and enlightenment initiatives. In 2017, the total expenditure on initiatives, programmes and projects dedicated to spreading education and knowledge amounted to AED 634 million.

 Dubai Cares
 The Mohammed Bin Rashid Al Maktoum Knowledge Foundation
 The Knowledge Summit
 The Mohammed Bin Rashid Al Maktoum Knowledge Award
 The Mohammed Bin Rashid Arabic Language Award
 The Mohammed Bin Rashid Library
The Arab Reading Challenge
 The Mohammed bin Rashid Arabic eLearning Project

Innovation and entrepreneurship

In 2017, MBRGI invested some AED 396 million in promoting new enterprises and sustainable innovation.

 The Dubai Future Foundation (Formerly Dubai Museum of the Future)
 The Mohammed Bin Rashid Establishment for SME Development (Dubai SME)
 The Mohammed Bin Rashid Award for Young Business Leaders
 The Mohammed Bin Rashid Al Maktoum Business Award

Empowering communities

With a 2017 investment of AED 129 million, these initiatives and programmes aim to unite communities under the theme of peaceful, cultural and intellectual exchange between nations, and facilitate constructive dialogue between societies.

 Arab Hope Makers
 The International Institute for Tolerance
 Mohammed bin Rashid Al Maktoum Tolerance Award
 The Arab Journalism Award
 The Arab Social Media Influencers Summit
 The Arab Social Media Influencers Awards
 The Arab Media Forum
 The Mohammed Bin Rashid Center for Leadership Development (MBRCLD)
 The Mohammed Bin Rashid School of Government (MBRSG)
 The Sheikh Mohammed Bin Rashid Al Maktoum Patrons of the Arts Award
 The Mohammed Bin Rashid School for Communication (MBRSC)
 The Mohammed Bin Rashid Al Maktoum Creative Sports Award
 Dubai International Sports Conference
 The Mohammed Bin Rashid Global Centre for Endowment Consultancy (MBRGCEC)
 Sheikh Mohammed Centre for Cultural Understanding (SMCCU)
 The Middle East Exchange

New initiatives 
Three new initiatives were launched under MBRGI during 2017: the International Institute for Tolerance, the Mohammed Bin Rashid Al Maktoum Arabic E-learning Project and One Million Arab Coders.

The Institute for Tolerance, the first of its kind in the Arab world, has stated aims of instilling a spirit of tolerance in society, building social cohesion and promoting the UAE as a role model for tolerance, working to combat extremism, and all forms of discrimination among people, including but not limited to, discrimination based on religion, gender, race, colour or language. On 25 January 2020, The International Institute for Tolerance today announced the names of the jury panel that will pick the winners of the Mohammed Bin Rashid Al Maktoum Tolerance Award.

MBRGI also launched the Mohammed Bin Rashid Al Maktoum Arabic eLearning Challenge in September 2017, which seeks to educate future generations of Arab researchers, scientists and innovators, by providing an online advanced learning platform. The project included the Translation Challenge as its first initiative contributing to its vision of improving education in the Arab world. The Translation Challenge involves the translation and localisation of thousands of educational videos on the subjects of science and maths, making them accessible online for free to millions of Arab students.

The One Million Arab Coders initiative set out to help young Arabs become fluent in coding and programming, offering free training as well as providing students and tutors with incentives worth over $1 million.

Board of trustees 
MBRGI's board of trustees is chaired by Sheikh Mohammed, with Crown Prince of Dubai Hamdan bin Mohammed Al Maktoum as its Vice Chair. Its Secretary General is UAE Minister for Cabinet Affairs, Mohammad Al Gergawi.

References 



External links
 MBRGI official website

Charities based in the United Arab Emirates
Foundations based in the United Arab Emirates
Humanitarian aid organizations
International charities
Geography of Dubai